John Cavanaugh may refer to:

 John Cavanaugh (baseball) (1900–1961), MLB player
 John Cavanaugh (politician) (born 1980), Nebraska politician
 John Cavanaugh (sculptor) (1921–1985)
 John C. Cavanaugh, former president of the University of West Florida and current chancellor of the Pennsylvania State System of Higher Education
 John J. Cavanaugh (1899–1979), American priest and academic administrator
 John Joseph Cavanaugh III (born 1945), American politician
 John R. Cavanaugh (1929–2007), American priest, teacher and scholar
 John W. Cavanaugh (1870–1935), American priest and academic administrator

See also 
 John Cavanagh (disambiguation)
 John Kavanagh (disambiguation)